Gyrodus (from  , 'curved' and   'tooth') is an extinct genus of pycnodontiform ray-finned fish that lived from the late Triassic (Rhaetian) to the middle Cretaceous (Cenomanian).

Distribution 
Fossils of Gyrodus have been found in:

Triassic
 Franche-Comté, France

Jurassic
 Quehita and Quebrada Formations, Chile
 Canjuers-Les Bessons quarry and Fumel, France
 Painten Formation and Liegende Bankkalk Formation, Germany 
 Sot de Chera Formation, Spain
 Calcareous Grit Formation, England

Cretaceous
 Agrio Formation, Argentina
 Ashville Formation, Canada
 Zapata Formation, Chile
 Baharîje Formation, Egypt
 Douiret Formation, Tunisia
 West Melbury Marly Chalk Formation, England

Gallery

References

Further reading 
 Fossils (Smithsonian Handbooks) by David Ward

Pycnodontiformes genera
Triassic bony fish
Jurassic bony fish
Cretaceous bony fish
Rhaetian genus first appearances
Cenomanian genus extinctions
Cretaceous fish of Africa
Fossils of Egypt
Fossils of Tunisia
Cretaceous United Kingdom
Fossils of England
Triassic France
Jurassic France
Fossils of France
Jurassic Germany
Fossils of Germany
Jurassic Spain
Fossils of Spain
Cretaceous fish of North America
Cretaceous Canada
Fossils of Canada
Late Triassic fish of Europe
Jurassic fish of Europe
Cretaceous fish of Europe
Jurassic fish of South America
Cretaceous fish of South America
Cretaceous Argentina
Fossils of Argentina
Jurassic Chile
Cretaceous Chile
Fossils of Chile
Fossil taxa described in 1843
Taxa named by Louis Agassiz